Raymordella xanthosoma is a beetle in the genus Raymordella of the family Mordellidae. It was described in 1967 by Franciscolo.

References

Mordellidae
Beetles described in 1967